The official German singles chart ranks the best-performing songs in Germany. Back in 1977, its data was compiled by Media Control on behalf of Bundesverband der Phonographischen Wirtschaft (BPW) and published in Musikmarkt each Monday.

Chart history

See also
List of number-one hits (Germany)

References

External links
 Official website Musikmarkt
 Official website Media Control

Number-one hits
Germany
1977